The 2002 College Nationals was the 7th Men's College Nationals.  The College Nationals was a team handball tournament to determined the College National Champion from 2002 from the US.

Venues
The championship was played at the Furman University in Greenville, South Carolina.

Final ranking
Source:

Awards
Source:

Top Scorers

Source:

All-Tournament Team
Source:

References

External links
 Tournament Results archived

USA Team Handball College Nationals by year
Furman Paladins